Chaudhary Sardar Singh was an indian politician and leader of Communist Party of India. He was a Member at Uttar Pradesh Vidhan Sabha represented Budhana constituency from 1967 to 1968.

References

Uttar Pradesh MLAs 1967–1969
Communist Party of India politicians from Uttar Pradesh
Year of birth missing